Olceclostera angelica, the angel moth, is a moth in the family Apatelodidae. The species was first described by Augustus Radcliffe Grote in 1864. It is found in North America, where it has been recorded from Quebec and Maine to Florida, west to Texas and north to Wisconsin and Ontario. The habitat consists of deciduous forests.

The forewings are silvery grey with brown lines and shading. The outer margins of both the forewings and hindwings are scalloped. Adults are on wing from May to September.

The larvae feed on the leaves of Fraxinus and Syringa species. They have a light silvery-brown body with three dorsal white lines, edged with black. The top of the head is black, bordered by long white hairs.

References

Moths described in 1864
Apatelodidae